Hope is a 2008 album by the Canadian hard rock band Harem Scarem. This was to be the band's twelfth and final studio album, but they re-formed in 2013 to release Mood Swings II. The European version of the album contains an acoustic version of "Higher", which was originally from their 2003 album Higher.

Track listing 

European bonus track
"Higher" (acoustic)

Band members
Harry Hess - lead vocals, guitar, producer
Pete Lesperance - lead guitar, backing vocals, producer
Barry Donaghy - bass guitar, backing vocals
Creighton Doane - drums, backing vocals

Charts

Release history

References

2008 albums
Harem Scarem albums
Frontiers Records albums